Kuliarchar - কুলিয়ারচর  ( kuliearcor) is an upazila of Kishoreganj District under the Division of Dhaka, Bangladesh. It is also a center of business, especially the fish, jute trade and processing plants, and the shoes sector of the country.

Geography
It has 26143 households and total area 104.01 km2. It is in north east side of Bangladesh.

Demographics
As of the 2011 Bangladesh census, Kuliarchar has a population of 182,236. Kuliarchar upazila's literacy rate and educational institutions Average literacy 41.3%; male 45.1%, female 37.4%.

Administration
Kuliarchar Upazila is divided into Kuliarchar Municipality and six union parishads: Chhaysuti, Faridpur, Gobaria Abdullahpur, Osmanpur, Ramdi, and Salua. The union parishads are subdivided into 46 mauzas and 97 villages.

Kuliarchar Municipality is subdivided into 9 wards and 37 mahallas.

Education
Kuliarchar has one degree college (Kuliarchar Government College), 3 high schools, 12 primary schools, and a madrasa.

Hospitals
 Upazila Health Complex

See also
Upazilas of Bangladesh
Districts of Bangladesh
Divisions of Bangladesh

References

Upazilas of Kishoreganj District